Nicholas A. Spano (born May 21, 1953) is a Republican politician from New York.

Biography
Spano's paternal grandfather, also named Nicholas, emigrated with two brothers from the Italian province of Bari to the United States in 1918.  Spano's father Leonard ran for public office in 1967, employing his son Nicholas in door-to-door campaigning.  After losing in 1967, Leonard became a county legislator in 1971, an office he held until 1993 when he was elected to the job of Westchester county clerk.

Nicholas Spano grew up in Yonkers as the oldest of 16 children of Leonard and Josephine Spano; He is a graduate of St. Peter's Elementary School in Yonkers and Iona College in New Rochelle, New York. He and his wife Linda reside in Yonkers. Spano has two children, Lenny and Christina.

Spano entered politics as a Republican. He was a member of the New York State Assembly from 1979 to 1986, sitting in the 183rd, 184th, 185th and 186th New York State Legislatures.

He was a member of the New York State Senate from 1987 to 2006, sitting in the 187th, 188th, 189th, 190th, 191st, 192nd, 193rd, 194th, 195th and 196th New York State Legislatures.

He represented Yonkers and surrounding areas in the Legislature. During his state senate career he served on the Rules, Transportation, Finance, Education, Health, and Racing, Gaming, and Wagering committees, chaired the Senate Investigations Committee, as was the Senior Assistant Majority Leader.

In 2004, Spano won re-election by only 18 votes after facing a serious challenge by Westchester County Legislator Andrea Stewart-Cousins.  During his run for re-election in 2006, Stewart-Cousins ran against him again, this time with the support of Democrats Bill Clinton, Hillary Clinton, Eliot Spitzer, David Paterson and Andrew Cuomo. This time, Spano lost; he conceded defeat on November 16, 2006.

Spano subsequently become involved in commercial real estate as well as lobbying state and local governments in New York through Empire Strategic Planning, a firm he established after his defeat.

In 2012 Spano was indicted for federal income tax evasion. Spano pleaded guilty to a single felony count. He admitted that he underreported his income — $42,419 in federal income taxes and $10,605 in state taxes — from 2000 to 2008. He was sentenced to a year and a day in prison.

In 1990, Spano recommended a boycott of Sinead O'Connor's concert in Saratoga Springs as retaliation against her choice to skip over the US national anthem at a Madison Square Garden concert some days prior.

References

External links
 

1953 births
Living people
Republican Party members of the New York State Assembly
Republican Party New York (state) state senators
Politicians from Westchester County, New York
Iona University alumni
American people of Italian descent
New York (state) politicians convicted of crimes
People from Yonkers, New York